Herefordshire County Cricket Club was established in 1992, with it joining the Minor Counties Championship in the same year as a replacement for Durham who had been elevated to first-class status at the end of the previous season. The club has played minor counties cricket since, and played List A cricket from 1995 to 2004, using a different number of home grounds during that time. Their first home minor counties fixture in 1992 was against Wales Minor Counties at The Park, Brockhampton, while their first home List A match came seven years later against Wiltshire in the 1999 NatWest Trophy at the same venue.

The eight grounds that Herefordshire have used for home matches since 1992 are listed below, with statistics complete through to the end of the 2014 season.

Grounds

Location of grounds

List A
Below is a complete list of grounds used by Herefordshire County Cricket Club when it was permitted to play List A matches. These grounds have also held Minor Counties Championship and MCCA Knockout Trophy matches.

Minor Counties
Below is a complete list of grounds used by Herefordshire County Cricket Club in Minor Counties Championship and MCCA Knockout Trophy matches.

Notes

References

Herefordshire County Cricket Club
Cricket grounds in Herefordshire
Herefordshire